The 1970 Connecticut gubernatorial election was held on November 3, 1970.

Incumbent Democratic Governor John N. Dempsey decided not to run for re-election. Republican nominee Thomas Meskill defeated Democratic nominee Emilio Q. Daddario with 53.76% of the vote.

Nominations

Between 1956 and 1990 in Connecticut, party conventions nominated candidates subject to a system of "challenge" primaries that allowed defeated candidates to petition for a popular vote if they received at least 20 percent of the convention vote.

Democratic nomination

Candidates
Emilio Q. Daddario, U.S. Representative for the 1st district

Results

Daddario was unopposed for the nomination at the state convention.

Republican nomination

Candidates
Wallace Barnes, State Senate Minority leader
Thomas Meskill, U.S. Representative for the 6th district

Results

The Republican state convention was held on June 20, 1970 at Hartford.

The Republican primary election was held on August 12, 1970.

General election

Candidates
Emilio Q. Daddario, Democratic
Thomas J. Meskill, Republican

Results

References

Bibliography
 
 
 

1970
Connecticut
Gubernatorial
November 1970 events in the United States